Dominik Schwaiger (born 1 May 1991) is a German World Cup alpine ski racer, specializing in Super-G.

He participated in the FIS Alpine World Ski Championships 2019.

World Championship results

References

External links

1991 births
Living people
German male alpine skiers
Alpine skiers at the 2022 Winter Olympics
Olympic alpine skiers of Germany
21st-century German people